Live at the Royal Albert Hall is a live album by The Cinematic Orchestra, released in the UK on 14 April 2008 on Ninja Tune Records. The original concert was performed on 2 November 2007 at The Royal Albert Hall in London.

Track listing
"All That You Give" (originally on Every Day)
"Child Song" (originally on Ma Fleur)
"Flite" (originally on Every Day)
"Familiar Ground" (featuring Heidi Vogel) (originally on Ma Fleur)
"To Build A Home" (featuring Grey Reverend) (originally on Ma Fleur)
"Prelude" (originally on Ma Fleur)
"Breathe" (featuring Heidi Vogel) (originally on Ma Fleur)
"Man With The Movie Camera" (originally on Man with a Movie Camera)
"Time & Space" (featuring Lou Rhodes) (originally on Ma Fleur)

External links
Cinematic Orchestra Official Website
Ninja Tune Official Website

The Cinematic Orchestra albums
Live albums recorded at the Royal Albert Hall
2008 live albums
Ninja Tune live albums